The Kalinin K-10 was a monoplane designed by Konstantin Alekseevič Kalinin to perform liaison, training and agricultural tasks.  From the technical point of view, it was characterized by the presence of tandem controls, fixed carriage, and folding wings, in order to make storage easier.

The K-10 flew for the first time in 1932, however, it never entered mass production.

Specifications (K-10)

References 

Kalinin aircraft